Thomas Edward Wing (12 August 1853 – 12 May 1935) was a Liberal Party politician in the United Kingdom.

He was elected at the January 1910 general election as  Member of Parliament (MP) for Grimsby, but lost that seat at the general election in December 1910.

He was returned to Parliament as MP for Houghton-le-Spring in County Durham at a by-election in 1913 following the death of the Liberal MP Robert Cameron.  He was defeated again at the 1918 general election, this time by the Labour candidate Robert Richardson.

After his defeat, he unsuccessfully contested the Dartford by-election in 1920.  He also stood in Spennymoor at the 1922 election, Grimsby for the 1924 general election and in Houghton-le-Spring for the 1929 election but never returned to the House of Commons.

References

External links 
 

1853 births
1935 deaths
Liberal Party (UK) MPs for English constituencies
UK MPs 1910
UK MPs 1910–1918
Members of the Parliament of the United Kingdom for Great Grimsby